New Ways Out is a 2016 album by Jim Jupp, under the pseudonym of Belbury Poly. It was scheduled to be released on 27 May 2016 by independent record label Ghost Box Music on CD, online download, and 12" vinyl record.

Accolades

Track listing

12" vinyl record

CD release

Reception 
DJ Food described the album "Autobahn-era Kraftwerk meets Glitter Band glam stomp meets folk-tinged vocals and sunshine Sesame Street ‘ba-ba-bum’ singalong harmonies."

References

External links
Ghost Box Music page

Belbury Poly albums
Ghost Box Music albums
2016 albums